GUM (an abbreviation of ) is the main department store in many cities of the former Soviet Union, known as State Department Store during the Soviet era (until 1991). Similarly named stores operated in some Soviet republics and in post-Soviet states.

The most famous GUM is the large store facing Red Square in the Kitai-gorod area – itself traditionally a mall of Moscow. Originally, and today again, the building functions as a shopping mall. During most of the Soviet period it was essentially a department store as there was one vendor: the Soviet State. Before the 1920s the location was known as the Upper Trading Rows.

As of 2021, GUM carries over 100 different brands, and has cafes and restaurants inside the mall.

Moscow GUM

Design and structure

With the façade extending for  along the eastern side of Red Square, the Upper Trading Rows were built between 1890 and 1893 by Alexander Pomerantsev (responsible for architecture) and Vladimir Shukhov (responsible for engineering). The trapezoidal building features a combination of elements of Russian medieval architecture and a steel framework and glass roof, a similar style to the great 19th-century railway stations of London.  William Craft Brumfield described the GUM building as "a tribute both to Shukhov's design and to the technical proficiency of Russian architecture toward the end of the 19th century".

The glass-roofed design made the building unique at the time of construction. The facade is divided into several horizontal tiers, lined with red Finnish granite, Tarusa marble, and limestone. Each arcade is on three levels, linked by walkways of reinforced concrete.

History

Catherine II of Russia commissioned Giacomo Quarenghi, a Neoclassical architect from Italy, to design a huge trade area along the east side of Red Square. However, that building was lost to the 1812 Fire of Moscow and replaced by trading rows designed by Joseph Bove. In turn, the current structure opened in 1894, replacing Bove's.

By the time of the Russian Revolution of 1917, the building contained some 1,200 stores. After the Revolution, GUM was nationalized. During the NEP period (1921–28), however, GUM as a State Department Store operated as a model retail enterprise for consumers throughout Russia regardless of class, gender, and ethnicity. GUM's stores were used to further Bolshevik goals of rebuilding private enterprise along socialist lines and "democratizing consumption for workers and peasants nationwide". In the end, GUM's efforts to build communism through consumerism were unsuccessful and arguably "only succeeded in alienating consumers from state stores and instituting a culture of complaint and entitlement".

GUM continued to be used as a department store until Joseph Stalin converted it into office space in 1928 for the committee in charge of his first Five Year Plan. After the suicide of Stalin's wife Nadezhda in 1932, the GUM was used briefly to display her body.

After reopening as a department store in 1953, GUM became one of the few stores in the Soviet Union that did not have shortages of consumer goods, and the queues of shoppers were long, often extending entirely across Red Square.

Several times during the 1960s and 1970s, the Second Secretary of the Communist Party Mikhail Suslov, who hated having a department store facing Lenin's Mausoleum, tried to convert GUM into an exhibition hall and museum showcasing the achievements of the Soviet Union and Communism, without the knowledge of General Secretary Leonid Brezhnev. Each time, however, Brezhnev was tipped off and put a stop to such plans.

At the end of the Soviet era, GUM was partially, then fully, privatized, and it had a number of owners before it ended up being owned by the supermarket company Perekrestok. In May 2005, a 50.25% interest was sold to Bosco di Ciliegi, a Russian luxury goods distributor and boutique operator. As a private shopping mall, it was renamed in such a fashion that it could maintain its old acronym. The first word Gosudarstvennyi ("state") has been replaced with Glavnyi ("main"), so that GUM is now an abbreviation for "Main Universal Store".

See also

 TsUM, another large Moscow department store.
 Passage, a department store in St. Petersburg.

References

Sources
 Brumfield, William Craft, (1991) The Origins of Modernism in Russian Architecture, University of California Press, Berkeley, Los Angeles, Oxford, 
 English, Elizabeth Cooper (2000).  "Arkhitektura i mnimosti": The origins of Soviet avant-garde rationalist architecture in the Russian mystical-philosophical and mathematical intellectual tradition", a dissertation in architecture, University of Pennsylvania
 Hilton, Marjorie L. (2004). "Retailing the Revolution: The State Department Store (GUM) and Soviet Society in the 1920s". Journal of Social History, (Oxford University Press) 37 (4): 939–964; 1127.  
 Rainer Graefe, Jos Tomlow: "Vladimir G. Suchov 1853–1939. Die Kunst der sparsamen Konstruktion." 192 S., Deutsche Verlags-Anstalt, Stuttgart, 1990,

External links

 GUM official website 
 
 Vladimir Grigorievich Shukhov
 The Roof of GUM

Department stores of Russia
Department stores of the Soviet Union
Buildings and structures in Moscow
Roof structures by Vladimir Shukhov
Tourist attractions in Moscow
Soviet brands
Commercial buildings completed in 1893
Shopping malls established in 1893
Red Square
Cultural heritage monuments of federal significance in Moscow
Shopping malls in Russia